The 2000–01 season was Reading's third season in Division Two, following their relegation from the Division One in 1998. It was Alan Pardew's second season as manager of the club. Reading finished the season in third place, qualifying for the Playoffs, where they were defeated in the final by Walsall 3–2. In the FA Cup, Reading were knocked out by York City after a replay in the Second Round, whilst in the League Cup, Leyton Orient defeated Reading over two legs in the First Round. Reading also reached the Second Round of the League Trophy, before defeat to Swansea City.

Season review
See also Nationwide League Division Two

Squad

Out on loan

Left club during season

Transfers

In

Loans in

Out

Loans out

Released

 Transfers announced on the above date, being finalised on 1 July 2001.

Competitions

Second Division

Results summary

Results by round

Results

League table

Play-offs

Final

FA Cup

League Cup

League Trophy South

Squad statistics

Appearances and goals

 

|-
|colspan="16"|Players who appeared for Reading but left during the season:

|}

Goalscorers

Clean sheets

Disciplinary record

Notes

References

Reading 2000-01 at soccerbase.com

Reading F.C. seasons
Reading